Torbay Lifeboat Station is the base for Royal National Lifeboat Institution (RNLI) search and rescue operations at Brixham, Devon in England. Brixham Lifeboat Station was opened in 1866 but since 1924 has been known as 'Torbay'. Since 2005 it has operated a  all-weather lifeboat (ALB) together with a  inshore lifeboat (ILB).

History
During the evening of 10 January 1866 a severe storm blew up and at least 74 vessels sought refuge again in Torbay and in the harbours at Brixham and Torquay. During the night the wind changed direction and increased in strength. The  Lifeboat China was brought by road to Torquay and rescued eleven men from two ships but at least 30 ships were wrecked and 70 people died in that storm. Afterwards the RNLI was asked to provide a lifeboat at Brixham. It proved difficult to find a site for a boathouse so the City of Exeter was at first kept at Bolton Cross and taken to the harbour on a carriage. At first it was kept under a tarpaulin but a boathouse was built for it later. In 1873 a new boathouse and slipway was built near the breakwater so that the boat could be launched straight into the harbour. The old boathouse was used as a fire station for many years but was demolished and the site used for a new post office.

In 1875 another lifeboat station was opened on Torbay, this time at Torquay. In 1917 the RNLI decided to rename 'Brixham Lifeboat Station' as 'Brixham and Paignton Lifeboat Station'. Five years later its 'pulling and sailing' lifeboat was replaced by a new motor lifeboat. This could cover a larger area and operate in more severe weather, so Torquay Lifeboat Station was closed the following year. In 1924 the station at Brixham was renamed as Torbay Lifeboat Station. A larger  motor lifeboat was sent to Torbay in September 1930. This was too large to be kept in the boathouse so it was moored in the harbour near the slipway. The boathouse was retained as a workshop but during World War II part of it was dismantled to make it easier for the Royal Navy to reach a new large slipway which was built over the old lifeboat slipway. The RNLI built a small pier in 1950 for the boarding boat that was used to ferry crews out to the lifeboat.

An inshore lifeboat was sent to Torbay for the summer of 1964. It proved a useful addition to the station and so became a permanent feature. Until 1969 the ILB was an inflatable Inshore Rescue Boat (later known as the ), but after that rigid A Class ILBs were kept moored in the harbour. Since January 1987 a modern D Class has been Torbay's ILB. A portable building was provided as a temporary boathouse for the ILB but in 1990 work was undertaken on the boathouse to house the ILB and improve the crew facilities. Further improvements were made in 2007 and at the same time a new pontoon was provided for the all-weather lifeboat.

The lifeboat station was granted the Honorary Freedom of the Borough of Torbay on 29 April 1988.

William Mogridge
William A Mogridge was appointed as Coxswain of the Torbay Lifeboat in October 1932. After two and a half hours the lifeboat reached the sinking boat, guided by the searchlight of an American steamer. Three of the crew had been taken off by another boat but it took careful manoeuvring of the lifeboat to rescue the one person left aboard. The fishing boat was often hidden from the lifeboat crew by the size of the waves and they collided a couple of times. Battling back into the wind the return journey to Brixham took five hours. For his courage and superb seamanship Mogridge was awarded an RNLI bronze medal.

On 23 January 1937 the SS English Trader ran aground on the Checkstone Ledge near the mouth of the River Dart. The lifeboat sailed from Brixham at 5:25 that morning and stood by while tugs tried to pull the casualty off the shore. The lifeboat was refuelled at Kingswear, but at 6 o'clock on the morning of 24 January the captain of the stricken vessel asked the lifeboat to take the crew off. During this time a strong gale had blown up and  waves were now breaking right over the beached ship. Mogridge brought the lifeboat under the stern and alongside to take off the ship's 32 crew and also 20 people from the tugs who had gone aboard to help. He then reversed the lifeboat out to safety. After landing the rescued men at Dartmouth the lifeboat returned to Brixham, gaining its home mooring at 12:15, nearly 31 hours after casting off. The RNLI awarded Mogridge a second bronze medal for his outstanding courage and superb seamanship.

The George Shee put to sea in the afternoon of 9 December 1939 to the aid of the disabled Channel Pride, a fishing boat that was racing for home as a gale blew up. They had dropped anchor just  from the cliffs near the River Dart. The lifeboat found the small boat with the help of a fire lit on the cliff top. It came right alongside and the two fishermen jumped on board, by which time the storm had blown the boats within  of the shore. Mogridge was subsequently awarded an RNLI silver medal for his tremendous courage and outstanding seamanship on this occasion.

16 December 1939 saw another gale blowing in Torbay and the schooner Henrietta ran aground off Dartmouth. When Mogridge and his crew arrived they found the sailing ship rolling heavily. He managed to come alongside and it took just three minutes for the seven crew members to be brought on board the George Shee. The boat rolled over onto the lifeboat and caused a  gash along her side. Mogridge was awarded a second silver medal, and bronze medals were given to William Pillar, his deputy, Richard Harris, the mechanic, and Frederick Sanders, the lifeboat's bowman.

William Mogridge retired from his position of coxswain in January 1942 and was succeeded by Frederick Sanders.

Other service awards
In total, Torbay Lifeboat Station crew have been awarded 26 RNLI medals for gallantry, one gold, six silver and 19 Bronze, the last in 2008. These are some of the most notable examples.

For this outstanding gallantry they were each awarded the Sea Gallantry Medal by His Majesty King George V.

In the early hours of 17 December 1944 the George Shee put to sea after two vessels were reported aground between Paignton and Torquay. It took half an hour to get the 14 crew off the tug, during which time the lifeboat often touched the bottom. They then turned to the second boat, Yard Craft 345 but ran aground before reaching it. The lifeboat forced itself free in reverse. After landing the people rescued from the tug at Brixham, they returned for another attempt. Many lifeboats struggled to find full crews during World War II and on this occasion the Torbay crew was two short, so the Assistant Mechanic had to join the crew on deck while the Motor Mechanic Richard Harris operated both engines on his own, sometimes waist deep in water. The five people on the craft were taken on board the lifeboat and back to Brixham. Harris was awarded an RNLI bronze medal, and coxswain Frederick Sanders received his second silver medal.

Harry Thomas became coxswain on 1 February 1951 and within a year had been awarded a bronze medal. It was on the evening of 30 January 1952 that he took the lifeboat out into a severe gale to search for the source of a white flashing light in Torbay. After searching for an hour and a half the army tug Trieste which had lost power with eleven men on board. After some difficulty in getting alongside the drifting tug they were all rescued although several of them were suffering from extreme seasickness. The one man and a dog were rescued, but a second man was swept off a rope and drowned. Also recognised for his work that night was Richard Harris who was awarded another bronze medal.

The MV Northwind was dragging her anchor in Torbay in a severe gale and heavy seas on the morning of 22 December 1964. By the time the Princess Alexandra of Kent had reached her she was aground between Paignton and Torquay. Although all the crew were taken off to the shore by Her Majesty's Coastguard, at one point it looked as though this would not be possible, and the lifeboat crew worked hard in difficult conditions to get alongside the stricken vessel. This work saw Richard Harris receive his fourth bronze medal, and coxswain Harold a silver medal.

The  wooden ILB put to sea on 5 October 1973 in response to a report of a woman in the water during a storm. Motor Mechanic Barry Pike spotted her and dived into the water while Coxswain Kenneth Gibbs used his skill to prevent the lifeboat crushing the two people in the water. Pike was washed ashore but returned and eventually brought the woman ashore, although she was found to be dead. He was awarded a silver medal for his courage and determination and also the Ralph Glister Award for the most meritorious service of the year by a member of the crew of an inshore lifeboat. Gibbs received his own bronze medal for his tremendous courage and excellent seamanship during a rescue that he led in the all-weather lifeboat on 16 December that year. On that occasion a sole crewman of the fishing boat Petit Michel was saved  out at sea in a Force 9 storm.

1976 was another year of outstanding rescues by the lifeboat crews at Torbay. On 23 August the lifeboat went to rescue 14 people and a dog who had been cast ashore when their speedboat was wrecked south of Dartmouth. Lifeboatman John Drew was awarded a bronze medal for swimming ashore with a line so that lifejackets could be transferred ashore and the survivors brought off the beach. During the course of an hour he had to swim out to the lifeboat seven times. Then on 6 December the lifeboat was called to the aid of the MV Lyrma after its steering gear had failed in a Force 10 storm. On this occasion it was under the command of Second Coxswain Keith Bower. The casualty was trying to face into the wind by using its engines alone. The storm was causing it to rise  on the waves; an attempt to get the crew off with a helicopter was unsuccessful. The lifeboat had to avoid being crushed under the ship – at one point the larger ship smashed the guard rails that prevent the lifeboat crew being washed overboard when on deck. Despite this they eventually managed to get eight of the casualty's crew on board and picked up the two people who had managed to get into a life raft. For this outstanding seamanship and tremendous courage a gold medal was awarded to Keith Bower, and bronze medals were given to Mechanic Steven Bower (his brother), Assistant Mechanic William Hunkin, and crew members Michael Mills, Nicholas Davies, Richard Brown and John Drew (his second medal in a year).

Two years later saw two more medal rescues at Torbay. Firstly, on 19 February 1978 when the pilot boat Leslie H found itself unable to steer in a Force 9 storm. Two men were taken off and the pilot boat towed back towards Brixham, but a  wave knocked the Edward Bridges right over so that her propellers and keel were out of the water. Her self-righting design proved itself and she was soon back upright, but lifeboatman John Ashford was missing. The lifeboat's coxswain, John Dyer, flicked the tow line across to the man overboard and he caught it and was pulled back on board. The captain was later taken off the pilot boat and the tow abandoned. For his courage, seamanship and leadership, Dyer was awarded a bronze medal. On 2 December Arthur Curnow, who had only been appointed coxswain three weeks earlier, took the lifeboat out in the early morning to the trawler Fairway which had broken down. Six people were rescued in a tricky operation in heavy seas. The new coxswain was awarded a bronze medal for this work.

On 13 January 2008 20 people were saved from the MV Ice Prince – 8 by the lifeboat and 12 by a Coastguard helicopter. They were operating in Force 9 winds and the stricken vessel was leaning at 45˚; the lifeboat had to approach it about 50 times to save those lives. Coxswain Mark Criddle received a silver medal in recognition of his courage, skill and determination.

Area of operation
Adjacent all-weather lifeboats are at Exmouth Lifeboat Station to the north, and Salcombe Lifeboat Station to the south.

Fleet

Pulling and sailing lifeboats

Motor lifeboats

Inshore lifeboats

See also
 List of RNLI stations

References

External links

 Official station website
 RNLI station information

Lifeboat stations in Devon
Torbay
Brixham